Park 'N Fly is an off-airport parking operator in the United States founded in 1967 in St. Louis Missouri by the lead magnate family's Theodore P (Ted) Desloge. The Atlanta, Georgia-based company was acquired in 1988 by the Dutch company BCD Group.

Park ‘N Fly has been operating for 55 years in 13 markets, with 14 facilities, and 80 affiliate locations offering services from valet parking to car detailing to pet boarding and even online reservations. Additionally, Park 'N Fly has a network of off-airport parking services at over 67 airports in the United States through its Internet-based reservation system, the Park 'N Fly Network.

Park 'N Fly has registered the trademark "Park 'N Fly", which was upheld as more than a descriptive trademark by the United States Supreme Court, in Park 'N Fly, Inc. v. Dollar Park & Fly, Inc., decided in 1985.

Airport Locations

See also

 Park 'N Fly Airport Parking

References

External links

 Park 'N Fly
 Park 'N Fly Network

Transport companies established in 1967
Companies based in Atlanta
Parking companies
1967 establishments in Georgia (U.S. state)
Desloge family